Muzičke paralele (trans. Musical Parallels) is the live album released by Serbian Irish folk/Celtic rock band Orthodox Celts and Serbian Latin American music band Pachamama. The album was recorded on the bands' concert in Novi Sad Synagogue, held on 15 September 1995, and self-released by the bands in 1996. The first six tracks on the album are performed by Pachamama, the following seven are performed by Orthodox Celts, and the last five are performed together by two bands.

Track listing

Personnel

Pachamama
Vladimir Lazić - guitar, vocals 
Stanislav Stanojević - charango, panpipes
Snežana Stanojević  - flute, panpipes

Orthodox Celts
Aleksandar Petrović - vocals
Ana Đokić - violin
Dejan Lalić - mandolin, banjo, guitar, tin whistle
Dušan Živanović - accordion, bodhrán, tin whistle
Vlada Jovković - guitar
Željko Janković - percussion

Additional personnel
Ivan Vlatković - recording
Svetozar Štrbac - engineer
Slobodan Misailović - producer

References 

 Muzičke paralele at Discogs

External links 
 Muzičke paralele at Discogs

Orthodox Celts live albums
1996 live albums
Self-released albums